Alan Mak Siu-fai (born 1 January 1965), is a Hong Kong writer, director, actor and producer.

Early life 
In 1965, Mak was born in Hong Kong.

Education 
In 1986, Mak studied at the School of Drama in the Hong Kong Academy for Performing Arts. Upon graduation in 1990, he started his movie career.

Career
Mak made his directorial debut in 1997, with his first film being Nude Fear, which was written and produced by Joe Ma. After that, Mak directed further films such as Rave Fever, A War Named Desire, Final Romance and Stolen Love, which would be his first collaboration with writer Felix Chong.

In 2002, Mak and Chong wrote their first script together. The movie was Infernal Affairs, which was produced by Mak's directing partner, Andrew Lau, who also served as cinematographer. Lau and Mak also served as directors for the film, and it would be the first of many collaborations involving the directing duo.

Infernal Affairs starred the four top actors of its year—Andy Lau, Tony Leung Chiu-Wai, Eric Tsang and Anthony Wong—along with the year's two top actresses—Kelly Chen and Sammi Cheng. Infernal Affairs was the number one box-office hit in Hong Kong that year, breaking several box office records alone. Furthermore, the film won many Hong Kong Film Awards, including Best Picture, Best Directors (Lau and Mak), Best Screenplay (Mak and co-writer Chong), and Best Supporting Actor (Wong). Infernal Affairs also went on win awards at the 40th Golden Horse Awards and the Golden Bauhinia Awards.

In 2003, Lau and Mak completed the trilogy with the prequel Infernal Affairs II and the sequel/prequel Infernal Affairs III. That same year, Mak received the 2003 Leader of the Year award in the Sports/Culture/Entertainment category.

In 2004, Lau and Mak worked on another blockbuster, Initial D, which was shot in Japan and released in Hong Kong during the summer. Once again, it was also another successful film for Lau and Mak, winning multiple awards at the Hong Kong Film Awards, winning for Best New Performer (Jay Chou), Best Supporting Actor (Anthony Wong Chau Sang| Anthony Wong), and Best Visual Effects.

In 2006, Lau, Mak and scriptwriter Felix Chong re-teamed to make the 2005 film, Moonlight in Tokyo. They re-teamed again for the 2006 film Confession of Pain, once again re-teaming with Infernal Affairs star Tony Leung Chiu-Wai. He also created The Silent War.

Mak's next film was Lady Cop & Papa Crook which he co-wrote and co-directed with Felix Chong. The film was released in 2008 and marked the feature-film return of Sammi Cheng after a three-year hiatus.

He has worked solidly since then releasing films up until 2019's Integrity. His next film Justices Seeker is in post-production.

Filmography 
 1998 Nude Fear
 1999 Rave Fever 
 2000 A War Named Desire
 2001 Final Romance
 2001 Stolen Love
 2002 Infernal Affairs
 2003 1:99 Shorts (segment)
 2003 Infernal Affairs II
 2003 Infernal Affairs III
 2005 Moonlight in Tokyo 
 2005 Initial D 
 2006 Confession of Pain
 2008 Lady Cop & Papa Crook 
 2009 Overheard
 2011 The Lost Bladesman 
 2011 Overheard 2
 2012 The Silent War
 2014 Overheard 3
 2015 I Am Somebody
 2017 Extraordinary Mission
 2019 Integrity
 2022 The Procurator
 2023 Insider

Awards and nominations

References

External links
 
 

Living people
1965 births
Hong Kong film directors
Hong Kong male actors
Hong Kong screenwriters
Hong Kong film producers